Robert Cance was a member of the Wisconsin State Assembly.

Biography
Cance was born in Wigtown, Scotland, sources have differed on the date. In 1858, he moved to the Town of Ettrick in Wisconsin, where he would become a farmer. Later, he became involved in business. Cance died in 1886.

Political career
Cance was a member of the Assembly in 1883. Other positions he held include Chairman (similar to Mayor) of Ettrick and Chairman of the county board of Trempealeau County, Wisconsin. He was a Republican.

References

People from Wigtown
Scottish emigrants to the United States
People from Trempealeau County, Wisconsin
Republican Party members of the Wisconsin State Assembly
Mayors of places in Wisconsin
County supervisors in Wisconsin
Businesspeople from Wisconsin
Farmers from Wisconsin
1886 deaths